Latvia competed at the 2002 Winter Olympics in Salt Lake City, United States.

Alpine skiing

Men

Biathlon

Men

Men's 4 × 7.5 km relay

Women

 1 A penalty loop of 150 metres had to be skied per missed target. 
 2 Starting delay based on 10 km sprint results. 
 3 One minute added per missed target.

Bobsleigh

Men

Cross-country skiing

Men
Pursuit

 1 Starting delay based on 10 km C. results. 
 C = Classical style, F = Freestyle

Ice hockey

Men's tournament

Preliminary round - group A
Top team (shaded) advanced to the first round.

Consolation round
9th place match

Luge

Men

(Men's) doubles

Women

Skeleton

Men

Speed skating

Women

References
Official Olympic Reports
 Olympic Winter Games 2002, full results by sports-reference.com

Nations at the 2002 Winter Olympics
2002 Winter Olympics
2002 in Latvian sport